The 1970 Men's World Weightlifting Championships were held in Columbus, Ohio, United States from September 12 to September 20, 1970. There were 129 men from 28 nations in the competition.

Nine weightlifters (Sandor Holczreiter, Walter Szoltysek, Vladimir Smetanin, Imre Földi, Henryk Trebicki, Miecyslaw Nowak, Jan Wojnowski, Yoshiyuki Miyake, Janos Bagocs) test positive for amphetamines (Dexedrine) and were disqualified. The urine samples were tested using the Beckman DK-2A ratio recording ultraviolet spectrophotometer.

Medal summary

Medal table
Ranking by Big (Total result) medals 

Ranking by all medals: Big (Total result) and Small (Press, Snatch and Clean & Jerk)

References

Results (Sport 123)
Weightlifting World Championships Seniors Statistics

External links
International Weightlifting Federation

World Weightlifting Championships
World Weightlifting Championships
World Weightlifting Championships
International weightlifting competitions hosted by the United States